Marina Grigorievna Golub (8 December 1957 — 9 October 2012) was a Russian film, television and stage actress. Most well known for her performances in Russian television program Morning Mail, Ah, Semenovna, Girls, Travelling Naturalist.

Her father – GRU Colonel Grigori E. Golub (1923-2014), a former military intelligence officer, served as consul in Finland and his mother – actress Ludmila Golub, played in the Theater Gogol. Grandfather – Efim Samoilovich Golub, at one time was the People's Commissar of Finance of the Ukrainian SSR (arrested in 1937). In 1979 she graduated from the Moscow Art Theatre School. From 2002 to 2012 she played on stage in the Chekhov Moscow Art Theatre.

Died in Moscow on the night of 9 to 10 October 2012 in a road accident.

Personal life
Marina Golub was married three times:

Her first husband was businessman Yevgeny Troinin.
They had a daughter, Anastasia  who works at the WonderLoft production center from February 11, 2013 she became one of the hosts of talk show "Girls" on the Russia 1 channel, from March to July 2015 - director of the Gogol Center.
Second husband was actor Vadim Dolgachev who worked in the Moscow theater "Complicity".
Third husband - Anatoliy Beliy, actor of the Stanislavsky and Moscow Art Theater; they divorced after 11 years of marriage.

Selected filmography 
 The Youth of Peter the Great (1980)
 At the Beginning of Glorious Days (1980)
 Shirli-Myrli (1995)
 The Admirer (1999)
 In Motion (2002)
 The Burning Land (2003)
 The Wedding (2000)
 A Driver for Vera (2004)
 Poor Relatives (2005)
 Playing the Victim (2006)
 Wedding Ring (TV) (2008)
 The Devil's Flower (2010)
 Moms (2012)
 Atomic Ivan (2012)

Awards
 Honored Artist of the Russian Federation (1995)   or achievements in the arts
 Order of Friendship (2008) for his great contribution in the development of national culture and art, and many years of fruitful activity

References

External links
 Official Website of Marina Golub (rus)

1957 births
2012 deaths
Actresses from Moscow
Soviet film actresses
Soviet stage actresses
Russian stage actresses
Russian film actresses
Russian television actresses
Russian television presenters
Soviet television presenters
Road incident deaths in Russia
Honored Artists of the Russian Federation
Burials in Troyekurovskoye Cemetery
Russian women television presenters
Moscow Art Theatre School alumni